Stadionul Moldova is a multi-use stadium in Roman. It is the home ground of CSM Roman and has a capacity of 100 seats. Moldova Stadium was re-organized in 2020, when almost the entire stadium (except the VIP zone) was demolished, as a result of the advanced degradation. The stands zone was sown with grass and trees were planted, now being under construction three smaller stands (two of 500 seats and one of 1,000 seats).

Gallery

References

External links
Stadionul Moldova. soccerway.com

Football venues in Romania
Buildings and structures in Neamț County
Roman, Romania